El Panecillo (from Spanish panecillo small piece of bread, diminutive of pan bread) is a 200-metre-high hill of volcanic-origin, with loess soil, located between southern and central Quito. Its peak is at an elevation of 3,016 metres (9,895 ft) above sea level. The original name used by the aboriginal inhabitants of Quito was Yavirac.  According to Juan de Velasco, a Jesuit historian, there was a temple on top of Yavirac where the Indians worshiped the sun until it was destroyed by the Spanish conquistadores. The street that leads up to El Panecillo is named after Melchor Aymerich.

Statue

In 1975, the Spanish artist Agustín de la Herrán Matorras was commissioned by the religious order of the Oblates to build a 45-meter-tall stone monument of a madonna which was assembled on a high pedestal on the top of Panecillo. Called "Virgin of El Panecillo", it is made of seven thousand pieces of aluminium. The monument was inaugurated on March 28, 1975, by the 11th archbishop of Quito, Pablo Muñoz Vega. The statue was engineered and erected by Anibal Lopez of Quito.

The virgin stands on top of a globe and is stepping on a snake, which is a classic madonna iconography. Less traditional are the wings. Locals claim that she is the only one in the world with wings like an angel. The monument was inspired by the famous "Virgen de Quito" (Quito's Madonna) also known as "the dancer" sculpted by Bernardo de Legarda in 1734, which now decorates the main altar at the Church of St. Francis.  This madonna represents a turning point of the Quito School of Art (one of the most renowned of the Americas) because it shows a virgin in movement that is practically dancing in contrast with the traditional static Madonnas that were produced during the 18th century.

According to a bronze placard affixed to the monument, the woman represented by the statue is the Woman of the Apocalypse, as described in the Book of Revelation (12:1–17).

See also
Virgin of Quito
Basilica and Convent of San Francisco, Quito
List of buildings in Quito

References

Hills of Ecuador
Outdoor sculptures
Quito Canton
Aluminium sculptures
1976 sculptures
Geography of Pichincha Province